Athanasios "Thanos" Plevris (born 21 May 1977) is a Greek politician and son of nationalist, neo-fascist author Konstantinos Plevris. He is currently serving as the Minister for Health under the cabinet of Kyriakos Mitsotakis. Plevris is often described as a radical right and islamophobic voice in Greek politics.

Political career 
He was first elected to the Hellenic Parliament with the ultraconservative Popular Orthodox Rally at the 2007 parliamentary election. He was subsequently elected to the European Parliament in June 2009, before returning to the national parliament at the election held in October of the same year. When the Popular Orthodox Rally failed to reach the electoral threshold of 3% at the May 2012 election, Plevris joined New Democracy and became the party's first substitute after the election held the following month. 

A few months after being elected to the Athens city council in May 2014, he was sworn in as a member of parliament for the third time in November 2014, replacing Dimitris Avramopoulos who had resigned his seat in order to serve on the European Commission. Plevris failed to be re-elected at the elections of January and September 2015, but returned to the legislature at the 2019 election. He currently serves as Minister for Health in the Cabinet of Kyriakos Mitsotakis.

Plevris practices law in Athens, having completed postgraduate and doctoral studies in medical law at Heidelberg University and in criminal law from the University of Athens respectively. He represented as lawyer the 8 police officers accused of brutality against Zak Kostopoulos. He completed his military service as a sergeant in the 32nd Marines Brigade.

Controversies 
He is widely seen as a far-right figure in Greek politics and some of his opinions have been described as extreme and racist. In the 1990s during his academic years he used to participate in nationalist protests and in at least one instance was caught on camera burning Turkish flags alongside supporters of the neo-nazi party Golden Dawn. Plevris has also advocated the use of deadly force as a deterrent against illegal immigration. He has also suggested that immigrants should be denied access to food, water and health care, in order to make their living conditions in Greece less attractive than those in their homelands.

Antisemitism 
While representing his father in court in 2019, he argued that Konstantinos Plevris’s public desire to see the return of Nazis and the reopening of the Auschwitz concentration camps should not count as hate speech or incitement under Greek law. After he was appointed as Minister for Health in 2021, some of this previous comments and statements resurfaced, resulting in a strong reaction by the Central Board of Jewish Communities in Greece. They issued a statement expressing concern over the appointment of Thanos Plevris as minister of health in the cabinet reshuffle. Plevris later apologised and avowed his “absolute respect” for Holocaust victims and opposition to antisemitism.

Vaccinations 
In July 2021 he published an op-ed article expressing controversial opinions about mandatory vaccinations and asking “if a citizen does not want to be vaccinated, is it my responsibility to convince them or should they go and get vaccinated themselves?". After his appointment in September 2021, some of his previous comments on scientific approaches and vaccination strategies resurfaced and were labelled as 'antivax'.

References

External links
 Personal Homepage 

 

Greek MPs 2007–2009
Popular Orthodox Rally politicians
1977 births
Living people
Greek MPs 2009–2012
Popular Orthodox Rally MEPs
MEPs for Greece 2009–2014
Politicians from Athens
Greek MPs 2019–2023